Nightmares! is a young adult children's literature series co-authored by Jason Segel and Kirsten Miller.
As of 5 November 2014, the series has been on The New York Times Best Seller list for children's book series. The series comprises three titles.

Charlie Laird is having nightmares. He gets them when he moves into his stepmom's mansion. And things are going to get worse when he enters the Netherworld!

See also

References

Penguin Random House
Young adult novel series
Novels about nightmares